Mafoa'aeata "Ata" Hingano (born 11 March 1997) is a Tonga international rugby league footballer who plays as a  or  for the York Knights in the Betfred Championship.

He has played for the New Zealand Warriors and the Canberra Raiders in the NRL. Hingano also played for the Mackay Cutters in the Queensland Cup, trained with the North Queensland Cowboys in the National Rugby League, and played for Salford Red Devils in the Super League.

Background
Hingano was born in Auckland, New Zealand, and is of Tongan descent. He attended Pakuranga College.

Playing career

Early career
He played his junior rugby league for the Pakuranga Jaguars, before being signed by the New Zealand Warriors.

From 2014 to 2016, Hingano played for the New Zealand Warriors' NYC team. On 12 December 2014, he re-signed with the Warriors on a 2-year contract until the end of 2016. In 2015 he also spent some time with the Warriors' NSW Cup team.

2016
In 2016, Hingano played for the Warriors at the 2016 Auckland Nines. He also spent some time with the Warriors' Under-20's and Intrust Super Premiership NSW teams.

On 7 May, Hingano played at halfback for the Junior Kiwis against the Junior Kangaroos, scoring two tries in the Kiwis' 20–34 loss. In round 24 of the 2016 NRL season, he made his NRL debut for the Warriors against the North Queensland Cowboys, coming on at five eighth from the interchange bench.

2017
Hingano signed a three-year contract with the Warriors, until the end of the 2020 season.

At the end of the year, he was selected to play for Tonga in the 2017 Rugby League World Cup.  He was the starting halfback in every match of the tournament including their semi-final loss to England.

2018
On 28 February 2018, Hingano was released by the New Zealand Warriors to join the Canberra Raiders.

He also retained his place in the Tonga squad as halfback for their historic first Test match against the Australian Kangaroos on October 20, but left the field with a dislocated shoulder early in the match.

2019
Hingano made no appearances for Canberra in the 2019 NRL season. Hingano instead played for Canberra's feeder club Mounties in the Canterbury Cup NSW competition. Hingano played for Mounties in their elimination final loss against Newtown at Campbelltown Stadium.

On 13 October, it was announced that Hingano had been released by Canberra. However, it was later revealed that Hingano would remain with the club as part of the development squad in 2020, before his release was once again confirmed two weeks later.

On 16 December, he signed with the Mackay Cutters for the 2020 Queensland Cup season.

2020
Hingano played just one game for the Cutters in 2020 before the season was canceled due to the COVID-19 pandemic. In November, Hingano joined the North Queensland Cowboys for pre-season training on a train-and-trial deal ahead of the 2021 NRL season.

2021
On 15 June 2021 it was reported that he had signed for Salford in the Super League.
On 19 November 2021 it was announced that Hingano had signed for Leigh in the Betfred Championship for the 2022 season.

2022
On 10 July, Hingano scored two tries for Leigh in a 66-0 victory over Workington Town.

References

External links

Canberra Raiders profile
New Zealand Warriors profile
NRL profile
2017 RLWC profile

1997 births
Living people
Canberra Raiders players
Junior Kiwis players
Leigh Leopards players
Mackay Cutters players
Mount Pritchard Mounties players
New Zealand expatriate sportspeople in England
New Zealand sportspeople of Tongan descent
New Zealand rugby league players
New Zealand sportsmen
New Zealand Warriors players
Pakuranga Jaguars players
People educated at Pakuranga College
Rugby league five-eighths
Rugby league halfbacks
Rugby league players from Auckland
Salford Red Devils players
Tonga national rugby league team players
York City Knights players